Walenty Czarnecki was a Polish professional football player, playing as a midfielder. He has spent the vast majority of his career with Śląsk Wrocław, where in the top flight alone he has made over 100 appearances and scored 3 goals for them.

References

1941 births
2020 deaths
People from Chodzież
Polish footballers
Association football midfielders